State Highway 58 is a two lane highway in Tamil Nadu, India.This road links Sadras - Thirukazhukundram - Chengalpattu - Kanchipuram - Arakkonam - Tiruthani Road

References 

State highways in Tamil Nadu